Once In A Lifetime was David Meece's eleventh album.

Track listing 

"Inside Out"  –  (M: David Meece, L: Meece, Dwight Liles) – 3:59
"Over You"  –  (M: Meece, L: Meece, Michael Hudson) – 4:02
"Brokenness"  –  (M: Meece, L: Meece, Hudson, Liles, Niles Borop) – 3:56
"Every Little Step"  –  (M: Meece, L: Meece, Liles, Deborah Meece) – 4:02
"Going Home"  –  (M: Meece, L: Meece, Hudson) – 5:04
"Early In the Morning"  –  (M: Meece, L: Meece, Hudson) – 4:45
"My Father's Chair"  –  (M: Meece, L: Meece, Liles) – 5:07
"Once In A Lifetime"  –  (M: Meece, L: Meece, Liles, Hudson, Debbie Meece) – 3:25
"Living In the Shadows"  –  (M: Meece, L: Meece, Hudson) – 3:30

Musicians 
 David Meece – vocals, acoustic piano, keyboards 
 Paul Mills – additional keyboards (6), additional percussion (6)
 George Cocchini – electric guitars
 Michael Hodge – electric guitars, acoustic guitars 
 Jerry McPherson – electric guitars
 Dale Oliver – electric guitars
 Brian Tankersley – bass, drums 
 Deborah Meece – viola (5)
 David Betros – backing vocals 
 Lisa Bevill – backing vocals 
 Kristina Clark – backing vocals 
 Reneé Garcia – backing vocals 
 Carrie Hodge – backing vocals 
 Gary Koreiba – backing vocals 
 Guy Penrod – backing vocals 
 Chris Rodriguez – backing vocals 
 Judson Spence – backing vocals 
 Sarah Underwood – backing vocals 
 Chris Willis – backing vocals 
 Kelly Meece – guest vocals (7)

Men's chorus on "Going Home"
 Morgan Cryar, John Mandeville, Hank Martin and Freddie Richardson

Production 
 Darrell A. Harris – executive producer 
 David Meece – producer 
 Brian Tankersley – producer, recording, mixing 
 Terry Bates – additional engineer, second engineer 
 Russell Burt – second engineer 
 Barry Campbell – second engineer 
 Greg Parker – second engineer 
 Hank Williams – mastering 
 Toni Thigpen – executive art direction
 Steve Urbano – sleeve art direction
 Joan Tankersley – creative director
 SRG Design – sleeve design, logo design, photo manipulation
 Valerie Gates – sleeve photography 
 Carter Bradley – grooming, wardrobe styling

Studios
 Recorded at Skylab Studios (Nashville, TN); Shakin' Studios and Allies Recording Studios (Franklin, TN).
 Mixed at Alpha Studios (Burbank, CA).
 Mastered at MasterMix (Nashville, TN).

Charts

References

1993 albums
David Meece albums